Notre-Dame-de-la-Sède Cathedral is one of two former co-cathedrals of the town of Saint-Lizier in southern France. The other is the Saint-Lizier Cathedral. The town of Saint-Lizier was formerly the seat of the Bishop of Couserans. The diocese was abolished under civil constitution of the clergy in 1790, and this was confirmed by the Concordat of 1801.

Architecture 

The present church building dates from the 12th century, and was built at the site of an earlier church. It was enlarged in the 14th century, and modified in the 16th century. The adjacent bishop's palace was built around 1675. It has been listed since 1994 as a monument historique by the French Ministry of Culture.

References

External links

Former cathedrals in France
Churches in Ariège (department)
Monuments historiques of Ariège (department)